The FIS Nordic World Ski Championships 1970 took place 14–22 February 1970 in Vysoké Tatry, Czechoslovakia (present-day Slovakia). This was the second time this city hosted the event having done so in 1935. It was the first time an event was televised in colour from Czechoslovakia though broadcasting there remained in black and white. This was the first championships that timed the results in hundredths of a second, a practice that continued until the 1980 Winter Olympics in Lake Placid when Sweden's Thomas Wassberg edged out Finland's Juha Mieto by 0.01 seconds in the men's 15 km event.

Men's cross-country

15 km 
17 February 1970

30 km 
16 February 1970

50 km 
20 February 1970

4 × 10 km relay
22 February 1970

Women's cross-country

5 km 
17 February 1970

10 km 
16 February 1970

3 × 5 km relay
22 February 1970

Men's Nordic combined

Individual 
15/16 February 1970

Men's ski jumping

Individual normal hill 
14 February 1970

Individual large hill 
21 February 1970

Medal table

References
FIS 1970 Cross country results
FIS 1970 Nordic combined results
FIS 1970 Ski jumping results
Results from German Wikipedia
Development of Slovak television 

FIS Nordic World Ski Championships
1970 in Nordic combined
1970 in Czechoslovak sport
Skiing competitions in Czechoslovakia
International sports competitions hosted by Czechoslovakia
February 1970 sports events in Europe
Nordic skiing competitions in Czechoslovakia